F. pratensis may refer to:
 Festuca pratensis, a grass species
 Formica pratensis, a red wood ant species found in Europe